Phulchand Prithvi Raj (September 13, 1931 – February 27, 2016) was an Indian American physician and anesthesiologist specializing in interventional pain management. His name is synonymous with regional anesthesia and interventional pain management including development of multiple training programs, training of thousands of individual physicians, numerous publications, and organization of interventional pain management as a distinct specialty. Some felt his passing created a void in interventional pain management across the globe. Some of his major contributions during his career involved the development and implementation of regional anesthesia and interventional pain management.

Personal background 
Phulchand Prithvi Raj Borundia was born September 13, 1931 in Bagri Sajjanpur, a small village approximately 100 miles west of Jaipur, Jaipur State, princely state of British India from 1128 to 1948, now the state of Rajasthan, India. His parents were Badani Bai (mother) and Phool Chandji Borundia (father).

During the pursuit of orthopedic surgery training, he met and married his Susan Martin, who was training as a nurse, in Darlington in 1963.  She also became his working partner professionally. They had 3 children together named Mark, Maya, and Sarah. He had 7 grandchildren named Saijal, Cameron, Devi, Christopher, Brevin, Colin, and Enzo. After retirement in 2003, he and his wife lived in Cincinnati, Ohio.

Education 
P. Prithvi Raj completed high school at St. Joseph's Boys' High School, Bangalore, Karnataka, India. Raj graduated from Mysore Medical College. He did his residency in orthopedics.

Dr. Raj entered a rotating internship in orthopedics at St. Mary’s Hospital, Waterbury, Connecticut. He started his residency in anesthesia in 1963 at Parkland Memorial Hospital in Dallas, Texas. He completed his third year of residency in Norway.

Professional background 
Raj was on the faculty at a number of universities in England, Norway, and throughout the United States. He was also one of the founders of the American Society of Regional Anesthesia (ASRA), the Texas Pain Society, and World Institute of Pain, along with fellowship examination in interventional pain management offered across the globe. He also founded or cofounded multiple journals including Pain Practice and Pain Digest He was a prolific writer and historian.

Dr Raj started as a house officer in 1958 in Ashton-under-Lyne, Manchester, and became registrar in 1962. After achieving his residency in orthopedics,  Raj decided to take his career to the United States. Raj entered a rotating internship at St. Mary’s Hospital, Waterbury, Connecticut.

Dr. Raj started his anesthesiology residency under chairman, Dr. Pepper Jenkins, in 1963 at Parkland Memorial Hospital in Dallas, Texas. He completed his third year of residency in Norway.

Dr. Raj was not only innovative and pioneering in scientific aspects, but also in promoting the specialty of regional anesthesia and interventional pain management. He was one of the 5 founders of ASRA in 1975. The history of the refounding of the ASRA, now known as the American Society of Regional Anesthesia and Pain Medicine (ASRA-PM), dates back to late 1973 when 5 dreamers met, now called the founding fathers of the ASRA, to form a society devoted to teach regional anesthesia. These 5 pioneers of regional anesthesia were Alon Winnie, Donald Bridenbaugh, Harold Carron, Prithvi Raj, and Jordan Katz.

Achievements and awards 
During Dr. Raj's professional career and even after his death, he received numerous honors and awards. Some of the significant recognitions and awards are as follows:
 2018 Giants in Pain Medicine Award instituted by American Society Of Interventional Pain Physicians (ASIPP)
 2014 Establishment of Annual Distinguished Lecture entitled: "Raj-Racz Distinguished Lecture"
 2013 Distinguished Service Award: ASIPP
 2009 John Bonica Award: ASRA
 2007 Recipient of Founding Father's Medal: ASRA
 2005 Distinguished Service Award: ASRA
 2003 Lifetime Achievement Award: ASIPP
 2003 Premio Guido Moricca Award: Sardinia, Italy
 2002 Career Excellence in Pain Medicine: American Neuromodulation Society
 2000 Outstanding achievements in Regional Anesthesia and Pain Medicine: TTUHSC Department of Anesthesiology and Pain Management
 2000 Carl Koller Award: European Society of Regional Anesthesia (ESRA)
 1995 Distinguished Academician: Academy of Medicine of Singapore

Dr Raj was certified by multiple organizations:
 1966 Fellow – American College of Anesthesiologists (FACA)
 1967 Fellow in the Faculty of Anesthetists of The Royal College of Surgeons of England FFARCS (England)
 1971 Diplomate American Board of Anesthesiology (DABA)
 1992 Diplomate American Board of Pain Medicine (DABP)
 1993 Added Qualification in Pain Management (ABA)
 1994 Fellow of Interventional Pain Practice FIPP
 2003 Recertification of added qualification in Pain Management (ABA)
 2005 Diplomate of American Board of Interventional Pain Physicians ABIPP

Selected works 
During a 5-year career in Dallas, Raj has researched many areas and is published in many forms.  Among them are:
Acute epiglottis in children: a respiratory emergency
Oxidation drug metabolism in human liver microsomes 
Techniques for fiberoptic laryngoscope in anesthesia 
The site of action of intravenous regiional anesthesia 
The use of the nerve stimulator with standard unsheathed needles in nerve blockage 
Infraclavicular brachial plexus - a new approach 
A new single-position supine approach to sciatic-femoral nerve block 
Physiology and pharmacokinetics of continuous infusions
Experience with volumetric infusion pumps for continuous epidural analgesia

References 

American anesthesiologists
1931 births
2016 deaths
Indian emigrants to the United States
American pain physicians